St. Britto High School, Mapusa. commonly known as St. Britto or St. Britto's, is a private Catholic primary and secondary school for boys located in Mapusa, Goa, on the west coast of India. It was founded in 1946 and is run by the Society of Jesus (Jesuits). It is all-boys and includes grades one through ten. In 2017 all 142 graduates passed the secondary exam.

History
Indo-Portuguese historian Dr. Teotonio de Souza, part of the school's staff in the 1970s, says this was the third institution set up by the Jesuits in Goa. Its founding was assisted by Valentino Pinto, a wine-merchant of Mapusa. Initially, the school was called Sacred Heart High School. Its original owner faced difficulties in staffing and running it, and handed it over to the Jesuits on 22 June 1946, in Portuguese-ruled Goa. Dom Caetano Menezes, the owner of St. Mary's school nearby, also handed over his institution to the Jesuits. The school's name was changed to St. Britto High School on 18 May 1948.

Early days
Dr. Teotonio R. de Souza suggests that the reputation of the Jesuits in Goa had been on the rise with their management of Theotonio High School, owned by the Goa Archdiocese.

Fr. Sylvester D'Souza was the first principal of the schools taken over, and both were initially co-educational. The Jesuits transferred the girls from the schools to the Apostolic Carmel (AC) nuns, already active in education in Goa, who went on to form the St. Mary's Convent High School, also at Mapusa along the Altinho hilltop where St. Britto is itself located.

Initially, St Britto's functioned from the Bardez Gymkhana site. Priests running the school and boarders rented houses atop the hill, an inconvenient arrangement especially during Goa's torrential monsoons. The new site of the school was purchased from Cipriano da Cunha Gomes. The Goa Archdiocese assisted construction with a loan. Fr. Ubaldo de Sá, of Moira, is credited with the construction.

The school's large facade dominates the town of Mapusa from a distance.

Coat of Arms 
The School Coat of Arms is divided thus:At the top, against a field of blue, is the monogram of the Society of Jesus, in a golden sun: IHS (the Greek shortform for the name of Jesus), surmounted by a cross. Below that, against a field of golden yellow, are the palms of martyrdom, which pay tribute to the Patron of the School, St. John de Britto. A red chevron separates the lamp of learning (to dispel darkness and ignorance) at the bottom of the coat of arms. At the bottom is the school motto, "Facta non Verba" on the scroll below the coat of arms, which means Deeds Not Words.

Activities and sports
The school has a Consumer Club and Eco Club, but emphasizes seasonal events and celebrations in which the whole school participates: Swachha Bharat Day, St. Ignatius day, Goa LIberation Day, and Christmas festivities including a carol competition.

Intramural sports include football, table tennis, badminton, chess, and basketball. Students are also trained after school hours in cricket, basketball, kabaddi, touch rugby, throw ball, net ball, sepak takraw, and boxing.

School anthem
         
Cheer boy cheer
Cheer the Britto flag
Hail to thee St. Britto
Cheer boy cheer
Cheer the Britto flag
Hail to thee St. Britto

We thy loyal trusted band 
We will ever be true
Light bearers and labourers 
True and pure and steadfast
    
Ch: Let's put on the armour light
Glory of Britto
Let's put on the armour light
Fight for God and country

Alma mater our friend and guide
Stay in shade and sunshine
Lend us light and wisdom lore
Ne'er to fail or falter

Be life's journey perilous
Thou to us a beacon

Headmasters 
    
 Fr.Sylvester D'Souza, SJ 1946–1949
 Fr.Irineu Lobo, SJ 1949–1950
 Fr.Edward V D'Souza, SJ 1950–1951
 Fr.Peter Mendonça, SJ 1951–1952
 Fr.Edward V D'Souza 1952–1962
 Fr.Lino D'Souza, SJ 1962–1964
 Fr.Mario C de Meyrelles, SJ 1964–1973  
    
 Fr.Teotonio de Sales, SJ 1973–1976
 Fr.Vincent Gomes Catao, SJ 1976–1982
 Fr.Anil Soares, SJ 1982–1988
 Fr.Joe Palliparambil, SJ 1988–1990
 Fr.Abraham Painumkal, SJ 1990–1999
 Fr.Apollo Cardozo, SJ 1999–2011
 Fr.Cedric Fernandes: 2011–2020
 Fr. Simon L de Melo, SJ 2020- Present

Notable alumni

 Alex Braganzamusician
 Lenny D' Gamabest international technical official 2017 Boxing Asia
 Alan de SouzaVolvo Asia Pacific parts manager
 Francis D'SouzaDeputy Chief Minister of Goa and Member of the Legislative Assembly
 Noel de SouzaDe Souza Group director and musician
 Ralph de Souzachairman of Tourism and Travel Association of Goa
 Roy de Souzadirector of Resicom Builders
 Oscar C. Lobofirst Goan Councillor in Australia
 Newton MarquesOHS inspector with the Australian Federal Government
 Eric MenezesVice-president of the Goa-based CMM Group of Companies 
 Mario Pereiraproprietor of Paulo Holiday Makers, a local transport company 
 Salvador PintoBank of Goa manager
 Maroj Pais Asst.GM at ACGL Goa

See also

 List of Jesuit schools

References

External links
 Britto's Old Boys' Association website
 Britto alumni webpage
 The Goa Jesuit Province of the Society of Jesus - The Jesuits in Goa
 Memoirs of a Britto boy
 Britto links on Google.com

1946 establishments in Portuguese India
Jesuit primary schools in India
Educational institutions established in 1946
High schools and secondary schools in Goa
Buildings and structures in Mapusa
Education in North Goa district
Jesuit secondary schools in India
Private schools in Goa